The Men's 50 metres Freestyle event at the 1st Short Course Worlds, held on 2 December 1993 in Palma de Mallorca, Spain.

Finals

Qualifying heats

See also
1995 FINA World Swimming Championships (25 m) – Men's 50 metre freestyle

References
 Results
 swimrankings

F